A predicament escape is any form of magic trick or escapology stunt in which the performer is trapped in an apparently dangerous situation and is required to escape from it. Classic examples include the Table of Death, Houdini's Chinese Water Torture Cell, Princess Tenko's escape from an exploding boat and the Upside Down Suspended Straitjacket escape, in which a performer is suspended high in the air from a burning rope. 

While many such feats are pure and simple escape acts performed for real, the predicament escape is also employed as a set-up or theme for certain illusions. These can end either with the performer emerging from the escape prop or appearing magically at another point in the performance space. Examples include a trick in which Melinda Saxe escaped from a tank filled with snakes during the 1998 television special The World's Most Dangerous Magic and a performance in the sequel show the following year in which the magician Margo was shackled in a coffin filled with rats and escaped to re-appear from behind the audience.

When performed by a female artist, these types of stunts sometimes involve aspects of the damsel in distress archetype, although with the damsel rescuing herself rather than waiting for a hero to come to her aid.

"Escape gone wrong" 
One sub-variant, sometimes known as "escape gone wrong" tricks, are presented initially as escape acts but then appear to go wrong, giving the audience the impression the performer must have been killed or badly injured. The artist uses illusion techniques to re-appear unharmed. The Table of Death is sometimes classified in this way. Another example is a stunt performed by Paul Daniels in which he was placed in a crate in the path of a race car, later emerging as the driver of the car after it had smashed through the crate. The Drill of Death illusion can also be presented as an "escape gone wrong".

Another variant on the "escape gone wrong" illusion ends without the performer re-appearing. Such a trick was performed by Paul Daniels on the Halloween edition of his BBC television show in 1987. He was chained up in an iron maiden type device where a set of spikes were set to close on him after a timer ran out. The broadcast showed the spikes closing on him before he had appeared and then the titles rolled. It was only revealed later that he was alright and the intended effect of the trick had been to shock viewers.

Cabinet escape 
The cabinet escape is the classic escapology trick, where the magician is trapped in a cabinet and required to escape from it. Often, the magician can be bound in handcuffs, rope and sacks before being placed in the cabinet. A cabinet escape involves the audience seeing the person come out of the cabinet unassisted.

References 

Escapology
Magic tricks